Katherine Darian-Smith,  (born 25 February 1961) is an Australian social historian and academic. She is executive dean and pro vice-chancellor at the University of Tasmania.

Early life and education
Katherine Darian-Smith was born in Sydney, New South Wales, in 1961. She is the daughter of neuroscientist Ian Darian-Smith, who became a professor at the University of Melbourne in 1972. She was educated at Kew High School and then the University of Melbourne, receiving a Bachelor of Arts with Honours in 1983 and a Doctor of Philosophy in 1988.

Career
Prior to her appointment as lecturer at the University of Melbourne in 1995, Darian-Smith had worked in the history department of the University of Sydney, at Ballarat University College and spent 1992 to 1994 at the University of London as deputy director, Sir Robert Menzies Centre for Australian Studies.

Since 2017 Darian-Smith has been executive dean and pro vice-chancellor at the University of Tasmania. She remains an honorary professorial fellow of the University of Melbourne.

Darian-Smith was elected Fellow of the Academy of the Social Sciences in Australia in 2008, and since 2019 has held a position on its executive committee. She is on the editorial board of History Compass for the Australasia and Pacific region.

Selected works

References

1961 births
Living people
University of Melbourne alumni
Academic staff of the University of Melbourne
Academic staff of the University of Tasmania
Australian women historians
Fellows of the Academy of the Social Sciences in Australia